San Ponso is a comune (municipality) in the Metropolitan City of Turin in the Italian region Piedmont, located about  north of Turin.  

San Ponso borders the following municipalities: Valperga, Salassa, Pertusio, Rivara, Busano, and Oglianico.

References

Cities and towns in Piedmont